The following is a timeline of gravitational physics and general relativity.

Before 1500
 3rd century BC - Aristarchus of Samos proposes heliocentric model, measures the distance to the Moon and its size
190 BC -Seleucus of Seleucia supported heliocentric model of Aristarchus of Samos and was the first to demonstrate it through reasoning.

1500s
 1543 – Nicolaus Copernicus places the Sun at the gravitational center, starting a revolution in science
 1583 – Galileo Galilei induces the period relationship of a pendulum from observations (according to later biographer).
 1586 – Simon Stevin demonstrates that two objects of different mass accelerate at the same rate when dropped.
 1589 – Galileo Galilei describes a hydrostatic balance for measuring specific gravity.
 1590 – Galileo Galilei formulates modified Aristotelean theory  of motion (later retracted) based on density rather than weight of objects.

1600s
 1602 – Galileo Galilei conducts experiments on pendulum motion.
 1604 – Galileo Galilei conducts experiments with inclined planes and induces the law of falling objects.
 1607 – Galileo Galilei derives a mathematical formulation of the law of falling objects based on his earlier experiments.
 1608 – Galileo Galilei discovers the parabolic arc of projectiles through experiment.
 1609 – Johannes Kepler describes the motion of planets around the Sun, now known as Kepler's laws of planetary motion.
 1665 – Isaac Newton introduces an inverse-square universal law of gravitation uniting terrestrial and celestial theories of motion and uses it to predict the orbit of the Moon and the parabolic arc of projectiles.
 1684 – Isaac Newton proves that planets moving under an inverse-square force law will obey Kepler's laws in a letter to Edmond Halley.
 1686 – Isaac Newton uses a fixed length pendulum with weights of varying composition to test the weak equivalence principle to 1 part in 1000.
 1686 – Isaac Newton publishes his Mathematical Principles of Natural Philosophy, where he develops his calculus, states his laws of motion and gravitation, proves the shell theorem, explains the tides, and calculates the figure of the Earth.

1700s
 1705 – Edmond Halley predicts the return of Halley's comet in 1758, the first use of Newton's laws by someone other than Newton himself.
 1755 – Immanuel Kant advances Emanuel Swedenborg's nebular hypothesis on the origin of the Solar System.
 1767 – Leonhard Euler solves Euler's restricted three-body problem.
 1772 – Joseph-Louis Lagrange discovers the Lagrange points.
 1796 – Pierre-Simon de Laplace independently introduces the nebular hypothesis.
 1798 – Henry Cavendish tests Newton's law of universal gravitation using a torsion balance, leading to the first accurate value for the gravitational constant and the mean density of the Earth.

1800s
 1846 – Urbain Le Verrier and John Couch Adams, studying Uranus' orbit, independently prove that another, farther planet must exist. Neptune was found at the predicted moment and position.
 1855 – Le Verrier observes a 35 arcsecond per century excess precession of Mercury's orbit and attributes it to another planet, inside Mercury's orbit. The planet was never found. See Vulcan.
 1876 – William Kingdon Clifford suggests that the motion of matter may be due to changes in the geometry of space
 1882 – Simon Newcomb observes a 43 arcsecond per century excess precession of Mercury's orbit
 1887 – Albert A. Michelson and Edward W. Morley in their famous experiment do not detect the ether drift
 1889 – Loránd Eötvös uses a torsion balance to test the weak equivalence principle to 1 part in one billion.
 1893 – Ernst Mach states Mach's principle; first constructive attack on the idea of Newtonian absolute space
 1898 – Henri Poincaré states that simultaneity is relative.
 1899 – Hendrik Antoon Lorentz published the Lorentz transformations.

1900s
 1902 – Paul Gerber explains the movement of the perihelion of Mercury using finite speed of gravity. His formula, at least approximately, matches the later model from Einstein's general relativity, but Gerber's theory was incorrect.
 1904 – Henri Poincaré presents the principle of relativity for electromagnetism
 1905 – Albert Einstein completes his special theory of relativity and states the equivalence of mass and energy,  in modern form.
 1907 – Albert Einstein introduces the principle of equivalence of gravitational and inertial mass and uses it to predict gravitational redshift and gravitational lensing.

1910s 
 1915-16 – Albert Einstein completes his general theory of relativity. He explains the perihelion of Mercury and calculates gravitational lensing correctly and introduces the post-Newtonian approximation.
 1915 – David Hilbert introduces Hilbert's action principle, another way of deriving the Einstein field equations of general relativity.
 1915 – Karl Schwarzschild publishes the Schwarzschild metric about a month after Einstein published his general theory of relativity. This was the first solution to the Einstein field equations other than the trivial flat space solution.
 1916 – Albert Einstein predicts gravitational waves.
 1916 – Willem de Sitter predicts the geodetic effect.
 1917 - Albert Einstein applies his field equations to the entire Universe. Physical cosmology is born.
 1916-20 – Arthur Eddington studies the internal constitution of the stars.
 1918 – Albert Einstein derives the quadrupole formula for gravitational radiation.
 1918 – Josef Lense and Hans Thirring find the gravitomagnetic frame-dragging of gyroscopes in the equations of general relativity.
 1919 – Arthur Eddington leads a solar eclipse expedition which detects gravitational deflection of light by the Sun, which, despite opinion to the contrary, survives modern scrutiny. Other teams failed for reasons of war and politics.

1920s 
 1921 – Theodor Kaluza demonstrates that a five-dimensional version of Einstein's equations unifies gravitation and electromagnetism
 1922 – Alexander Friedmann derives the Friedmann equations.
 1923 – George David Birkhoff proves Birkhoff's theorem on the uniqueness of the Schwarzschild solution.
 1924 – Edwin Hubble discovers Hubble's law.
 1927 – Georges Lemaître publishes his hypothesis of the primeval atom.

1930s 
 1931 – Subrahmanyan Chandrasekhar studies the stability of white dwarfs.
 1931 – Georges Lemaître and Arthur Eddington predict the expansion of the Universe.
 1931 – Albert Einstein introduces his cosmological constant.
 1931 – Albert Einstein and Willem de Sitter propose the Einstein-de Sitter cosmological model.
 1935 – Albert Einstein and Nathan Rosen derive the Einstein-Rosen bridge, the first wormhole solution.
 1936 – Albert Einstein predicts that a gravitational lens brightens the light coming from a distant object to the observer.
 1937 – Fritz Zwicky states that galaxies could act as gravitational lenses
 1937 – Albert Einstein and Nathan Rosen obtain the Einstein-Rosen metric, the first exact solution describing gravitational waves.
 1938 – Albert Einstein, Leopold Infeld, and Banesh Hoffmann obtain the Einstein-Infeld-Hoffmann equations of motion.
 1939 – Hans Bethe shows that nuclear fusion is responsible for energy production inside stars, building upon the Kelvin–Helmholtz mechanism.
 1939 – Robert Serber, George Volkoff, Richard Tolman, and J. Robert Oppenheimer study the stability of neutron stars, obtaining the Tolman–Oppenheimer–Volkoff limit
 1939 – J. Robert Oppenheimer and Hartland Snyder examine the continued gravitational contraction of a star

1940s 
 1948 – Ralph Alpher and Robert Herman predict the cosmic microwave background.
 1949 – Cornelius Lanczos introduces the Lanczos potential for the Weyl tensor.
 1949 – Kurt Gödel discovers Gödel's solution.

1950s
 1953 – P. C. Vaidya Newtonian time in general relativity, Nature, 171, p260.
 1956 – John Lighton Synge publishes the first relativity text emphasizing spacetime diagrams and geometrical methods,
 1957 – Felix A. E. Pirani uses Petrov classification to understand gravitational radiation,
 1957 – Richard Feynman introduces his sticky bead argument,
 1957 – John Wheeler discusses the breakdown of classical general relativity near singularities and the need for quantum gravity
 1959 – Pound–Rebka experiment, first precision test of gravitational redshift,
 1959 – Lluís Bel introduces Bel–Robinson tensor and the Bel decomposition of the Riemann tensor,
 1959 – Arthur Komar introduces the Komar mass,
 1959 – Richard Arnowitt, Stanley Deser and Charles W. Misner developed ADM formalism.

1960s
 1960 – Martin Kruskal and George Szekeres independently introduce the Kruskal–Szekeres coordinates for the Schwarzschild vacuum.
 1960 – Shapiro effect confirmed,
 1960 – Thomas Matthews and Allan R. Sandage associate 3C 48 with a point-like optical image, show radio source can be at most 15 light minutes in diameter,
 1960 – Carl H. Brans and Robert H. Dicke introduce Brans–Dicke theory, the first viable alternative theory with a clear physical motivation,
 1960 – Ivor M. Robinson and Andrzej Trautman discover the Robinson-Trautman null dust solution
 1960 – Robert Pound and Glen Rebka test the gravitational redshift predicted by the equivalence principle to approximately 1%
 1961 – Pascual Jordan and Jürgen Ehlers develop the kinematic decomposition of a timelike congruence,
 1961 – Robert Dicke, Peter Roll, and R. Krotkov refine the Eötvös experiment to an accuracy of 10-11,
 1962 – Roger Penrose and Ezra T. Newman introduce the Newman–Penrose formalism,
 1962 – Ehlers and Wolfgang Kundt classify the symmetries of Pp-wave spacetimes,
 1962: –Joshua Goldberg and Rainer K. Sachs prove the Goldberg–Sachs theorem.
 1962 – Ehlers introduces Ehlers transformations, a new solution generating method,
 1962 – Richard Arnowitt, Stanley Deser, and Charles W. Misner introduce the ADM reformulation and global hyperbolicity,
 1962 – Yvonne Choquet-Bruhat on Cauchy problem and global hyperbolicity,
 1962 – Istvan Ozsvath and Englbert Schücking rediscover the circularly polarized monochromomatic gravitational wave,
 1962 – Hans Adolph Buchdahl discovers Buchdahl's theorem,
 1962 – Hermann Bondi introduces Bondi mass,
 1962 - Hermann Bondi, M. G. van der Burg, A. W. Metzner, and Rainer K. Sachs introduce the asymptotic symmetry group of asymptotically flat, Lorentzian spacetimes at null (i.e., light-like) infinity.
 1963 – Roy Kerr discovers the Kerr vacuum solution of Einstein's field equations,
 1963 – Redshifts of 3C 273 and other quasars show they are very distant; hence very luminous,
 1963 – Newman, T. Unti and L.A. Tamburino introduce the NUT vacuum solution,
 1963 – Roger Penrose introduces Penrose diagrams and Penrose limits,
 1963 – First Texas Symposium on Relativistic Astrophysics held in Dallas, 16–18 December,
 1964 – R. W. Sharp and Misner introduce the Misner–Sharp mass,
 1964 – Hong-Yee Chiu coins the term 'quasar' for quasi-stellar radio sources.
 1964 – Irwin Shapiro predicts a gravitational time delay of radiation travel as a test of general relativity
 1965 – Roger Penrose proves first of the singularity theorems.
 1965 – Newman and others discover the Kerr–Newman electrovacuum solution,
 1965 – Penrose discovers the structure of the light cones in gravitational plane wave spacetimes,
 1965 – Kerr and Alfred Schild introduce Kerr-Schild spacetime,
 1965 – Subrahmanyan Chandrasekhar determines a stability criterion,
 1965 – Arno Penzias and Robert Wilson discover the cosmic microwave background radiation,
 1965 – Joseph Weber puts the first Weber bar gravitational wave detector into operation
 1966 – Sachs and Ronald Kantowski discover the Kantowski-Sachs dust solution.
 1967 – Jocelyn Bell and Antony Hewish discover pulsars.
 1967 – Robert H. Boyer and R. W. Lindquist introduce Boyer–Lindquist coordinates for the Kerr vacuum.
 1967 – Bryce DeWitt publishes on canonical quantum gravity,
 1967 – Werner Israel proves the no-hair theorem, and the converse of Birkhoff's theorem.
 1967 – Kenneth Nordtvedt develops PPN formalism,
 1967 – Mendel Sachs publishes factorization of Einstein's field equations,
 1967 – Hans Stephani discovers the Stephani dust solution,
 1968 – F. J. Ernst discovers the Ernst equation,
 1968 – B. Kent Harrison discovers the Harrison transformation, a solution-generating method,
 1968 – Brandon Carter solves the geodesic equations for Kerr–Newmann electrovacuum with Carter's constant.
 1968 – Hugo D. Wahlquist discovers the Wahlquist fluid,
 1968 – Irwin Shapiro presents the first detection of the Shapiro delay
 1968 – Kenneth Nordtvedt studies a possible violation of the weak equivalence principle for self-gravitating bodies and proposes a new test of the weak equivalence principle based on observing the relative motion of the Earth and Moon in the Sun's gravitational field
 1969 – William B. Bonnor introduces the Bonnor beam,
 1969 – Joseph Weber reports observation of gravitational waves a claim now generally discounted.
 1969 – Penrose proposes the (weak) cosmic censorship hypothesis and the Penrose process,
 1969 – Misner introduces the mixmaster universe,
 1965-70 – Subrahmanyan Chandrasekhar and colleagues develops the post-Newtonian expansions.
 1968-70 – Roger Penrose, Stephen Hawking, and George Ellis prove that singularities must arise in the Big Bang models.

1970s
 1970 – Vladimir A. Belinskiǐ, Isaak Markovich Khalatnikov, and Evgeny Lifshitz introduce the BKL conjecture,
 1970 – Hawking and Penrose prove trapped surfaces must arise in black holes,
 1970 – the Kinnersley-Walker photon rocket,
 1970 – Peter Szekeres introduces colliding plane waves,
 1971 – Stephen W. Hawking proves the area theorem for black holes.
 1971 – Peter C. Aichelburg and Roman U. Sexl introduce the Aichelburg–Sexl ultraboost,
 1971 – Introduction of the Khan–Penrose vacuum, a simple explicit colliding plane wave spacetime,
 1971 – Robert H. Gowdy introduces the Gowdy vacuum solutions (cosmological models containing circulating gravitational waves),
 1971 – Cygnus X-1, the first solid black hole candidate, discovered by Uhuru satellite,
 1971 – William H. Press discovers black hole ringing by numerical simulation,
 1971 – Harrison and Estabrook algorithm for solving systems of PDEs,
 1971 – James W. York introduces conformal method generating initial data for ADM initial value formulation,
 1971 – Robert Geroch introduces Geroch group and a solution generating method,
 1972 – Jacob Bekenstein proposes that black holes have a non-decreasing entropy which can be identified with the area,
 1972 – Sachs introduces optical scalars and proves peeling theorem,
 1972 – Rainer Weiss proposes concept of interferometric gravitational wave detector in an unpublished manuscript.
 1972 – J. C. Hafele and R. E. Keating perform Hafele–Keating experiment,
 1972 – Richard H. Price studies gravitational collapse with numerical simulations,
 1972 – Saul Teukolsky derives the Teukolsky equation,
 1972 – Yakov B. Zel'dovich predicts the transmutation of electromagnetic and gravitational radiation,
 1973 – P. C. Vaidya and L. K. Patel introduce the Kerr–Vaidya null dust solution,
 1972 – Carter, Hawking and James M. Bardeen propose the four laws of black hole mechanics,
 1973 – Publication by Charles W. Misner, Kip S. Thorne and John A. Wheeler of the treatise Gravitation, the first modern textbook on general relativity,
 1973 – Publication by Stephen W. Hawking and George Ellis of the monograph The Large Scale Structure of Space-Time,
 1973 – Robert Geroch introduces the GHP formalism,
 1973 – Homer Ellis obtains the Ellis drainhole, the first traversable wormhole.
 1974 – Russell Hulse and Joseph Hooton Taylor, Jr. discover the Hulse–Taylor binary pulsar,
 1974 – James W. York and Niall Ó Murchadha present the analysis of the initial value formulation and examine the stability of its solutions,
 1974 – R. O. Hansen introduces Hansen–Geroch multipole moments,
 1974: –Tullio Regge introduces the Regge calculus,
 1974 – Stephen Hawking discovers Hawking radiation.
 1974 – Stephen Hawking shows that the area of a black hole is proportional to its entropy, as previous conjectured by Jacob Bekenstein.
 1975 – Chandrasekhar and Steven Detweiler compute quasinormal modes,
 1975 – Szekeres and D. A. Szafron discover the Szekeres–Szafron dust solutions,
 1976 – Penrose introduces Penrose limits (every null geodesic in a Lorentzian spacetime behaves like a plane wave),
 1976 – Gravity Probe A experiment confirmed slowing the flow of time caused by gravity matching the predicted effects to an accuracy of about 70 parts per million.
 1976 – Robert Vessot and Martin Levine use a hydrogen maser clock on a Scout D rocket to test the gravitational redshift predicted by the equivalence principle to approximately 0.007%
 1978 – Penrose introduces the notion of a thunderbolt,
 1978 – Belinskiǐ and Zakharov show how to solve Einstein's field equations using the inverse scattering transform; the first gravitational solitons,
 1979 – Dennis Walsh, Robert Carswell, and Ray Weymann discover the gravitationally lensed quasar Q0957+561
 1979-81 – Richard Schoen and Shing-Tung Yau prove the positive mass theorem. Edward Witten independently proves the same thing.

1980s 
 1981 – Alan Guth proposes cosmic inflation in order to solve the flatness and horizon problems.
 1982 – Joseph Taylor and Joel Weisberg show that the rate of energy loss from the binary pulsar PSR B1913+16 agrees with that predicted by the general relativistic quadrupole formula to within 5%.
 1986 – Helmut Friedrich proves that the de Sitter spacetime is stable.
 1986 – Bernard Schutz shows that cosmic distances can be determined using sources of gravitational waves without references to the cosmic distance ladder. Standard-siren astronomy is born.
 1988 – Mike Morris, Kip Thorne, and Yurtsever Ulvi obtain the Morris-Thorne wormhole. Morris and Thorne argue for its pedagogical value.

1990s 

 1993 – Demetrios Christodoulou and Sergiu Klainerman prove the non-linear stability of the Minkowski spacetime.
 1995 – John F. Donoghue show that general relativity is a quantum effective field theory. This framework could be used to analyze binary systems observed by gravitational-wave observatories.
 1995 – Hubble Deep Field image taken, It is a landmark in the study of cosmology.
 1996-98 – RELIKT-1 and COBE identify anisotropy in the cosmic microwave background.
 1998-99 – Scientists discover that the expansion of the Universe is accelerating.
 1999 – Alessandra Buonanno and Thibault Damour introduce the effective one-body formalism. This was later used to analyze data collected by gravitational-wave observatories.

2000s 
 2002 – First data collection of the Laser Interferometer Gravitational-Wave Observatory (LIGO).
 2005 – Daniel Holz and Scott Hughes coin the term "standard sirens."
 2009 – Gravity Probe B experiment verifies the geodetic effect to 0.5%.

2010s
 2012 – Hubble Ultra-Deep Field image released. It was created using data collected by the Hubble Space Telescope between 2003-2004.
 2013 – NuSTAR and XMM-Newton measure the spin of the supermassive black hole at the center of the galaxy NGC 1365.
 2015 – Advanced LIGO reports the first direct detections of gravitational waves, GW150914 and GW151226, mergers of stellar-mass black holes. Gravitational-wave astronomy is born.
This marks the first time electromagnetic and gravitational waves are detected from a single source.
 2017 – Multi-messenger astronomy reveals neutron-star mergers to be responsible for the nucleosynthesis of some heavy elements, such as strontium, via the rapid-neutron capture or r-process.
 2017 – Scientists begin using gravitational-wave sources as "standard sirens" to measure the Hubble constant, finding its value to be broadly in line with the best estimates of the time. Refinements of this technique will help resolve discrepancies between the different methods of measurements.
 2017 – Neutron Star Interior Composition Explorer (NICER) arrives on the International Space Station.
 2017-18 – Georgios Moschidis proves the instability of the anti-de Sitter spacetime.
 2018 – Final paper by the Planck satellite collaboration. Planck operated between 2009 and 2013.
 2018 – Mihalis Dafermos and Jonathan Luk disprove the strong cosmic censorship hypothesis for the Cauchy horizon of a uncharged, rotating black hole.
 2018 –  Advanced LIGO-VIRGO collaboration constrains equations of state for a neutron star using GW170817.
 2018 – Kris Pardo, Maya Fishbach, Daniel Holz, and David Spergel limit the number of spacetime dimensions through which gravitational waves can propagate to 3 + 1, in line with general relativity and ruling out models that allow for "leakage" to higher dimensions of space. Analyses of GW170817 have also ruled out many other alternatives to general relativity, and proposals for dark energy.
 2019 – Event Horizon Telescope (EHT) images the shadow of supermassive black hole M87*.
 2019 – Advanced LIGO and VIRGO detect GW190814, the collision of a 26-solar-mass black hole and a 2.6-solar-mass object, either an extremely heavy neutron star or a very light black hole. This is the largest mass gap seen in a gravitational-wave source to-date.

2020s
 2022 – EHT releases an image of Sagittarius A*, the central supermassive black hole of the Milky Way.
 2022 – James Webb Space Telescope (JWST) publishes its first image, a deep-field photograph of the SMACS 0723 galaxy cluster.
 2022 – Neil Gehrels Swift Observatory detects GRB 221009A, the brightest gamma-ray burst recorded.
 2022 – JWST identifies several candidate high-redshift objects, corresponding to just a few hundred million years after the Big Bang.

See also

 Timeline of black hole physics
 Timeline of special relativity and the speed of light

References

External links
Timeline of relativity and gravitation (Tomohiro Harada, Department of Physics, Rikkyo University)
Timeline of General Relativity and Cosmology from 1905

Astrophysics
Gravity
Gravitational physics and relativity